Sergio George Presents: Salsa Giants is a live album by various artists and American pianist and record producer Sergio George. It was released on 24 June 2013 through Sony Music Latin and Top Stop Music. It has the participation of artists with whom George recorded and produced albums in the past such as Tito Nieves, Marc Anthony, Oscar D'León, Luis Enrique, and Orquesta de la Luz among others.

The live album featured great hits from the singers recorded live at the Curaçao North Sea Jazz Festival on 31 August 2012. Such hits were "Valió la Pena", "Yo No Sé Mañana", "Fabricando Fantasías", "Un Disco Más", "Mi Bajo y Yo, "Anacaona", "Casi Te Envidio", "Aguanilé", "Medias Negras", "Tu Amor Me Hace Bien" among others.

The album is part of the discography of Sergio George who in 2014 released an EP with the same name which contained the single "Para Celebrar", according to George he contacted all the artists to see if they were interested in participating in the project. Which they all said yes. At the 14th Annual Latin Grammy Awards the album was the winner of the Latin Grammy Award for Best Salsa Album in November 2013.

Background 
The project was born as a hope to rescue the salsa genre for the young public after the great impact that the song "Vivir Mi Vida" by Marc Anthony had, according to George's words: "We thought of a meeting of friends, of the best soneros, George told PRODU in a quality show for youth Marc Anthony, Oscar D'León, Cheo Feliciano, Andy Montañez, Luis Enrique, Willy Chirino, José Alberto "El Canario", Tito Nieves, Nora from the Orquesta de la Luz and Charlie Zaa, they accepted the invitation to be part of the best meeting of salseros of these times. I called the singers and each one said yes, the idea was that they sing their hits, I wanted a show in which people sang all the songs".

Repertoire and recordings 
Sergio George Presents: Salsa Giants It featured fifteen tracks, eight of these tracks were produced by George, and all of these were composed and written by multiple composers. "Aguanilé", for example, was composed by Héctor Lavoe and Willie Colón in 1970 for the album El Juicio, the song was re-recorded in 2007 by Marc Anthony for the Soundtrack album El Cantante inspired by the film of the same name, "Yo No Sé Mañana" composed by Jorge Luís Piloto and Jorge Villamizar recorded in 2009 for their album Ciclos which would win Best Salsa Album in 2010 and win the Latin Grammy Award for Best Tropical Song at the 10th Annual Latin Grammy Awards. "Un Disco Más" by the Colombian singer Charlie Zaa was recorded in 1995 for his album Sentimientos which was released in 1996 through Sonolux Records, composed and written by Leopoldo Gonzáles, originally the song had been performed by Ecuadorian pasillos and boleros singer Julio Jaramillo becoming hits in both cases indisputable for both interpreters. Sentimientos given a Premio Lo Nuestro award for "Tropical Album of the Year".

"Valió la Pena" by Marc Anthony was composed in its Latin pop version for the album Amar Sin Mentiras in 2004 by José Luis Pagán, Fernando Estefano Salgado and by Anthony himself and later adapted to the album carried by himself. Name to a Salsa version that was produced by Sergio George, from the same album there is also "Tu Amor Me Hace Bien" that was also composed in Latin Pop and later in Salsa Version.

Commercial performance 
The album was released in the United States on 24 June 2013. The Recording Industry Association of America (RIAA) certified Sergio George Presents: Salsa Giants Latin gold on 31 January 2014 for shipments of 30,000 copies.

Singles 
"Para Celebrar" released on 12 June 2013 It was the only single from the album and was performed in November 2013 at the 14th Annual Latin Grammy Awards.

Track listing

Personnel 
The following credits are from AllMusic.

Performers 

José Aguirre — trumpet
Tito Allen — vocals (background), chorus
Jorge Díaz — trombone
Diego Galé — congas
Sergio George — piano, keyboards
Diego Giraldo — vocals (background), chorus
Guianko Gómez — vocals (background), chorus
Pepe Montes — keyboards
Tommy Ruiz — chorus
Rubén Rodríguez — bass
José Sibaja — trumpet
Antonio Vázquez — trombone
Víctor Vázquez — trombone
Robert Vilera — timbales

Technical 

Carlos Álvarez — engineer, mixing engineer
Juan Mario "Mayito" Aracil — engineer
Pablo Croce — music director
Valério Do Carmo — art director
Gregory Elías — executive producer
Sergio George — executive producer, music director
Guianko Gómez — associate producer
Gerardo Lopez — production assistant
Andrés Wolf — photography
Catalina Wolf — concert coordinator

Primary artists 

Marc Anthony
Oscar D'León
Charlie Zaa
José Alberto "El Canario"
Willy Chirino
Orquesta de la Luz
Luis Enrique
Tito Nieves
Andy Montañez
Cheo Feliciano

Certifications

See also 
2013 in Latin music

References 

2013 live albums
Albums produced by Sergio George
Latin Grammy Award for Best Salsa Album
Sony Music Latin live albums
Spanish-language albums
Various artists albums
Live salsa albums